Cello Song is an album recorded by the cellist Julian Lloyd Webber in 1993 for Philips.

Track listing
 Song of the Black Swan by Heitor Villa-Lobos (Filmed Performance)
 Cantata BWV 156 Adagio by J.S. Bach (Filmed Performance)
 Sea Murmurs by Mario Castelnuovo Tedesco
 5 Stücke im Volkston, Op. 102 No. 2 Langsam by Robert Schumann
 Etude, Op.8 No.11 by Alexander Scriabin
 Romance in F minor by Serge Rachmaninoff
 An den Frühling by Edvard Grieg
 Serenade by Frederick Delius
 Romance. Op.62 by Edward Elgar
 Cello Sonata in G minor, Op. 65 Largo by Frédéric Chopin
 Wie Melodien zieht es mir, Op. 105 No. 1, by Johannes Brahms
 Songs My Mother Taught Me Op.55 No.4 by Antonín Dvořák
 Star of the County Down Traditional
 Beau soir by Claude Debussy
 Louange à l'éternité de Jésus by Olivier Messiaen

Personnel
 Julian Lloyd Webber, Cello
 John Lenehan, Piano

References

External links 

 Cello Song album reviews

1993 albums
Julian Lloyd Webber albums